Jamie Scott Gordon is a Scottish actor and writer known for the 2013 horror film Lord of Tears. He is active with the theater project The Village Pub Theatre.

Filmography

Films
Blooded (2010, as Chris)
Making Ugly (2011, as Stark)
Lord of Tears (2013, as Allen Milton)
Kids vs Monsters (2015, as Taxi Driver)
The Unkindness of Ravens (2015, as Andrew)
Good Intentions (2015, as Josh)
Bonejangles (2015, as Randy) 
The Black Gloves (2017, as Finn Galloway) 
Never Not Love You (2018, as David)
Automata (2019, as Dr. Brendan Cole) 
For We Are Many (2019, as Jacob, segment "Wendigo")

Short films
Chairs: A Farce of Death (2010, as The Boy)
The Waster (2011, as Jeff Daniels)
Nine Mile Creek (2019, as Prospector Stu)
Wendigo (2019, as Jacob)

Theater
Medusa's Snakes (2008, as Monstrous)
Some Girls (2009, as Man)
There Are No Blue Castles (2009, as Dr Rankin)
The Waiting Room (2011, as Arthur)
The Cherry Orchard (2011, as Yasha)
Good Vibrations (2013, as Beebop)
Scots Who Enlightened The World (2013, as James Hutton)
Hooray For All Kinds Of Things (2015, as Ottar Proppe)
Magnet Mixer (as Comedy Improvisor)
Coldest Show on Earth (as Luke)
Shakespere and Cervantes  (as William Shakespeare)
Il Timeo De Bernard P (as Moreno)
Dick Whittington (as Captain Hawkeye)
Alice in Wonderland (as March Hare)

References

External links
 
 

Scottish male film actors
Scottish male stage actors
Scottish male writers
Living people
21st-century Scottish male actors
21st-century Scottish writers
21st-century British male writers
Year of birth missing (living people)